The dowry system in India refers to the durable goods, cash, and real or movable property that the bride's family gives to the groom, his parents and his relatives as a condition of the marriage. Dowry is referred to dahez in Hindi and as jahez in Urdu.

The dowry system can put great financial burden on the bride's family. In some cases, the dowry system leads to crime against women, ranging from emotional abuse and injury to even deaths. The payment of dowry has long been prohibited under specific Indian laws including the Dowry Prohibition Act 1961 approved by the Parliament of India and subsequently by Sections 304B and 498A of the Indian Penal Code. The Dowry Prohibition Act 1961 defines dowry: "Dowry means any property or valuable security given or agreed to be given either directly or indirectly - (a) by one party in marriage to the other party in marriage; or (b) by the parents of either party to a marriage or by any other person to either party to marriage or to any other persons;at or before or after the marriage as consideration for the marriage of the said parties, but does not include dower or mahr in the case of persons to whom the Muslim Personal law applies."

A court judgement clarifies the legal definition of dowry as

Article 3 of the Dowry Prohibition Act, 1961 specifies that the penalty for giving or taking dowry does not apply to presents that are given at the time of a marriage to the bride or groom is when no demand for them has been made.

Although Indian laws against dowries have been in effect for decades, they have been largely criticised as being ineffective. The practice of dowry deaths and murders continues to take place unchecked in many parts of India, which has further added to the concerns of enforcement.

Section 498A of the Indian Penal Code required the groom and his family to be automatically arrested if a wife complains of dowry harassment. The law was widely abused, and in 2014, the Supreme Court ruled that arrests cannot be made without a magistrate's approval.

Historical context 

The history of dowry in South Asia is not clear. Some scholars believe dowry was practised in antiquity, but some do not. The traces of the dowry system in India can be found in the Vedic Age where it is common for upper caste Hindus.

 The Code of Manu sanctioned dowry and bridewealth in ancient India, but dowry was the more prestigious form and associated with the Brahmanic (priestly) caste.
 Dowries originally started as “love gifts” for the marriages of upper caste individuals, but during the medieval period, the demands for dowries became a precursor for marriage.

Michael Witzel claims the ancient Indian literature suggests dowry practices were not significant during the Vedic period. Witzel also notes that women in ancient India had property inheritance rights either by appointment or when they had no brothers.

The findings of MacDonell and Keith are similar to Witzel, and differ from Tambiah; they cite ancient Indian literature suggesting bridewealth was paid even in brahma- and daiva-types of marriage. Dowry was not infrequent when the girl suffered from some bodily defect. Property rights for women increased in ancient India, suggest MacDonell and Keith, over the Puranas.

Kane claims ancient literature suggests bridewealth was paid only in the asura-type of marriage that was considered reprehensible and forbidden by Manu and other ancient Indian scribes. Lochtefeld suggests that religious duties listed by Manu and others, such as 'the bride be richly adorned to celebrate marriage' were ceremonial dress and jewelry along with gifts that were her property, not property demanded by or meant for the groom; Lochtefeld further notes that bridal adornment is not currently considered as dowry in most people's mind.

One of these are the eyewitness records from Alexander the Great conquest (ca. 300 BC) as recorded by Arrian and Megasthenes. Arrian first book mentions a lack of dowry,

Arrian's second book similarly notes,

The two sources suggest dowry was absent, or infrequent enough to be noticed by Arrian. About 1200 years after Arrian's visit, another eyewitness scholar visited India named Abū Rayḥān al-Bīrūnī, also known as Al-Biruni, or Alberonius in Latin. Al-Biruni was an Islamic era Persian scholar who went and lived in India for 16 years from 1017 CE. He translated many Indian texts into Arabic, as well as wrote a memoir on Indian culture and life he observed. Al-Biruni claimed,

Al-Biruni further claims that a daughter, in 11th century India, had legal right to inherit from her father, but only a fourth part of her brother. The daughter took this inheritance amount with her when she married, claimed Al-Biruni, and she had no rights to income from her parents after her marriage or to any additional inheritance after her father's death. If her father died before her marriage, her guardian would first pay off her father's debt, then allocate a fourth of the remaining wealth to her upkeep until she is ready to marry, and then give the rest to her to take with her into her married life.

Causes of the dowry 
Various reasons have been suggested as cause of dowry practice in India. These include economic factors and social factors.

Economic factors 
There are many economic factors that contribute towards the system of dowry. Some of these include inheritance systems and the bride's economic status.

Some suggestions point to economics and weak legal institutions on inheritance place women in disadvantage, with inheritances being left only to sons. This leaves women dependent upon their husbands and in-laws, who keep the dowry when she marries. Prior to 1956, including during the British Raj, daughters had no rights of inheritance to their family's wealth. In 1956, India gave equal legal status to daughters and sons among Hindu, Sikh and Jain families, under the Hindu Succession Act (India grants its Muslim population the Sharia derived personal status laws). Despite the new inheritance law, dowry has continued as a process whereby parental property is distributed to a daughter at her marriage by a social process, rather than after parents death by a slow court supervised process under Hindu Succession Act (1956).

Dowry gave, at least in theory, women economic and financial security in their marriage in the form of movable goods. This helped prevent family wealth break-up and provided security to the bride at the same time. This system can also be used as a premortem inheritance, as once a woman is presented with movable gifts, she may be cut off from the family estate.

For many, dowry has become a greater financial burden on the family, and can leave families destitute based on the demands from the groom. 
The demand for dowry has increased over time.

Social factors 
The structure and kinship of marriage in parts of India contributes to dowry. In the north, marriage usually follows a patrilocal (lives with husband's family) system, where the bride is a non-related member of the family. This system encourages dowry perhaps due to the exclusion of the bride's family after marriage as a form of premortem inheritance for the bride. In the south, marriage is more often conducted within the bride's family, for example with close relatives or cross-cousins, and in a closer physical distance to her family. In addition, brides may have the ability to inherit land, which makes her more valuable in the marriage, decreasing the chance of dowry over the bride price system.

In addition to marriage customs that may influence dowry, social customs or rituals, and parents' expectations of dowry are important factors to consider. A 1995 study showed that while attitudes of people are changing about dowry, dowry continues to prevail. In a 1980 study conducted by Rao, 75% of students responded that dowry was not important to marriage, but 40% of their parents likely expected dowry.

While India has been making progress for women's rights, women continue to be in a subordinate status in their family. Women's education, income, and health are some significant factors that play into the dowry system, and for how much control a woman has over her marriage.

Religious factors 
Dowry in India is not limited to any specific religion. It is widespread among Hindus and other religions. For example, Indian Muslims call dowry as jahez, justify the practice in terms of jahez-e-fatimi. Islamists classify jahez into two categories: The first comprises some essential articles for the outfit of the bride as well as for conjugal life. The other is made up of valuable goods, clothes, jewelry, an amount of money for the groom's family, which is settled on after bargaining. The jahez often far exceeds the cost of the baraat and marriage parties. The jahez is separate from cash payment as Mahr or dower that Sharia religious law requires.

Dowry in the modern era 

Dowry had been a prevalent practice in India's modern era and in this context, it can be in the form of a payment of cash or gifts from the bride's family to the bridegroom's family upon marriage. There are variations on dowry prevalence based on geography and class. States in the north are more likely to participate in the dowry system among all classes, and dowry is more likely to be in the form of material and movable goods. In the south, the bride price system is more prevalent, and is more often in the form of land, or other inheritance goods. This system is tied to the social structure of marriage, which keeps marriage inside or close to family relations.

Dowry also varies by economic strata in India. Upper-class families are more likely to engage in the dowry system than the lower class. This could be in part due to women's economic exclusion from the labor market in upper classes.

When dowry evolved in the Vedic period, it was essentially followed by the upper castes to benefit the bride, who was unable to inherit property under Hindu law. To counter this, the bride's family provided the groom with dowry which would be registered in the bride's name. This dowry was seen as stridhan (Sanskrit: woman's property). Also, an important distinction is the fact that while the upper castes practised dowry, the lower castes practised bride price to compensate her family for the loss of income.

In the modern era, the concept of dowry has evolved and Indian families no longer practise the dowry. This is because with the passage of time, bride price gradually disappeared and dowry became the prevalent form of transfer. In the modern era, the practice of dowry requires the bride's family to transfer goods to the groom's family in consideration for the marriage.

Since marriages in India are a time for big celebrations in each family, they tend to be very lavish. Accordingly, Indian weddings usually involve considerable expenditure and accompanying wedding presents from relatives in both sides of the family. This is normal expenditure which is done willingly and varies from one family to another depending on the wealth, status, etc.

Many times, as part of this mutual 'give-and-take', an attempt is made by the groom's family to dictate the quantum of each gift along with specific demands for dowry. In such circumstances, there is an element of exerting coercion on the bride's family and this is what has come to be recognized as the menace of dowry in today's times. Dowry does not refer to the voluntary presents which are made to the bride and the groom; rather it is what is extracted from the bride or her parents.

Types of dowry crimes 
Recently married women can be a target for dowry related violence because she is tied economically and socially to her new husband. In some cases, dowry is used as a threat or hostage type situation, in order to extract more property from the bride's family. This can be seen in new brides, who are most vulnerable in the situation. Dowry crimes can occur with the threat or occurrence of violence, so that the bride's family is left with no choice but to give more dowry to protect their daughter. The northern and eastern states of India show higher rates of dowry-related violence.

Dowry is considered a major contributor towards observed violence against women in India. Some of these offences include physical violence, emotional abuses, and even murder of brides and young girls prior to marriage. The predominant types of dowry crimes relate to cruelty (which includes torture and harassment), domestic violence (including physical, emotional and sexual assault), abetment to suicide and dowry death (including, issues of bride burning and murder).

Fraud 
A 2005 Canadian documentary film, Runaway Grooms, exposed a phenomenon of Indo-Canadian men taking advantage of the dowry system. These men would fraudulently return to India ostensibly seeking a new bride, but then abandon the woman and return to Canada without her as soon as they had secured possession of her dowry.

Cruelty 
Cruelty in the form of torture or harassment of a woman with the objective of forcing her to meet a demand for property or valuable security is a form of dowry crime. The cruelty could be in the form of verbal attacks or may be accompanied by beating or harassment in order to force the woman or her family to yield to dowry demands. In many instances, the cruelty may even force the woman to commit suicide and it has been specifically criminalized by the anti-dowry laws in India.

Domestic violence 

Domestic violence includes a broad spectrum of abusive and threatening behavior which includes physical, emotional, economic and sexual violence as well as intimidation, isolation and coercion. There are laws like the Protection of Women from Domestic Violence Act, 2005 that help to reduce domestic violence and to protect women's rights.

Abetment to suicide 
Continuing abuse by the husband and his family with threats of harm could lead to a woman committing suicide. In such situations, the dowry crime even extends to abetment of suicide, which includes all acts and attempts to intentionally advise, encourage, or assist in committing suicide. The impact of dowry can leave a woman helpless and desperate, which can cumulate in emotional trauma and abuse. Dowry related abuse causes emotional trauma, depression and suicide. The offence of abetment to suicide is significant because in many cases, the accused persons often bring up a defense that the victim committed suicide at her own volition, even though this may not be true in reality.

Dowry murder 

Dowry deaths and dowry murder relate to a bride's suicide or killing committed by her husband and his family soon after the marriage because of their dissatisfaction with the dowry. It is typically the culmination of a series of prior domestic abuses by the husband's family. Most dowry deaths occur when the young woman, unable to bear the harassment and torture, commits suicide by hanging herself or consuming poison. Dowry deaths also include bride burning where brides are doused in kerosene and set ablaze by the husband or his family. Sometimes, due to their abetment to commit suicide, the bride may end up setting herself on fire.

Bride burnings are often disguised as accidents or suicide attempts. Bride burnings are the most common forms of dowry deaths for a wide range of reasons like kerosene being inexpensive, there being insufficient evidence after the murder and low chances of survival rate. Apart from bride burning, there are some instances of poisoning, strangulation, acid attacks, etc., as a result of which brides are murdered by the groom's family.

India, with its large population, reports the highest number of dowry related deaths in the world according to Indian National Crime Record Bureau. In 2012, 8,233 dowry death cases were reported across India, while in 2013, 8,083 dowry deaths were reported. This means a dowry-related crime causes the death of a woman every 90 minutes, or 1.4 deaths per year per 100,000 women in India.

Laws against dowry 

The first all-India legislative enactment relating to dowry to be put on the statute book was The Dowry Prohibition Act, 1961 and this legislation came into force from 1 July 1961. It marked the beginning of a new legal framework of dowry harassment laws effectively prohibiting the demanding, giving and taking of dowry. Although providing dowry is illegal, it is still common in many parts of India for a husband to seek a dowry from the wife's family and in some cases, this results in a form of extortion and violence against the wife.

To further strengthen the anti-dowry law and to stop offences of cruelty by the husband or his relatives against the wife, new provisions were added to the Indian criminal law – section 498A to Indian Penal Code and section 198A to the Criminal Procedure Code in 1983. In 2005, the Protection of Women from Domestic Violence Act was passed, which added an additional layer of protection from dowry harassment. Although the changes in Indian criminal law reflect a serious effort by legislators to put an end to dowry-related crimes, and although they have been in effect for many years now, they have been largely criticised as being ineffective.

Dowry Prohibition Act, 1961 
The Dowry Prohibition Act, 1961 consolidated the anti-dowry laws which had been passed on certain states. This legislation provides for a penalty in section 3 if any person gives, takes or abets giving or receiving of dowry. The punishment could be imprisonment for minimum 5 years and a fine more than ₹15,000 or the value of the dowry received, whichever is higher. Dowry in the Act is defined as any property or valuable security given or agreed to be given in connection with the marriage. The penalty for giving or taking dowry is not applicable in case of presents which are given at the time of marriage without any demand having been made.

The Act provides the penalty for directly or indirectly demanding dowry and provides for a penalty involving a prison term of not less than 6 months and extendable up to two years along with a fine of ₹10,000. Dowry agreements are void ab initio and if any dowry is received by anyone other than the woman, it should be transferred to the woman. The burden of proving that an offense was not committed is on the persons charged and not on the victim or her family. Under its powers to frame rules for carrying out its objectives under the Act, the government of India has framed the Maintenance of Lists of Presents to the Bride and the Bridegroom Rules, 1985. There are also several state level amendments to the Dowry Prohibition Act.

Criminal statutes – Indian Penal Code, Criminal Procedure Code and Evidence Act 
The Indian criminal laws were comprehensively amended to include dowry as a punishable offence. Section 304B was added to the Indian Penal Code, 1860 ("IPC"), which made dowry death a specific offence punishable with a minimum sentence of imprisonment for 7 years and a maximum imprisonment for life. It provided that if the death of a woman is caused by burns or bodily injury or occurs in suspicious circumstances within 7 years of her marriage, and there's evidence to show that before her death, she was subjected to cruelty or harassment by her husband or his relative regarding the demand for dowry, then the husband or the relative shall be deemed to have caused her death.

Further, section 113B of the Evidence Act, 1872 ("Evidence Act"), creates an additional presumption of dowry death when it is shown that before her death, the woman had been subjected to cruelty on account of dowry demand. Section 304B IPC along with Section 113B of the Evidence Act have enabled the conviction of many who were not caught by the Dowry Prohibition Act, 1961. Section 113A of the Evidence Act provides a similar presumption of abetment of suicide (which is an offense under Section 306 IPC), in case of death of a married woman within a period of seven years of her marriage.

Additionally, the judiciary also includes a murder charge under Section 302 IPC as this allows courts to impose death penalty on perpetrators of the offence. Section 406 IPC, pertaining to offences for the criminal breach of trust, applies in cases of recovery of dowry as it is supposed to be for the benefit of the woman and her heirs.

Further, Section 498A IPC was specifically included in 1983 to protect women from cruelty and harassment. The constitutionality of Section 498A was challenged before the Supreme Court of India on grounds of abuse,  that it gave arbitrary power to the police and the court. However, it was upheld in Sushil Kumar Sharma v. Union of India (2005). The Code of Criminal Procedure, 1973 provides that for the prosecution of offences under Section 498A IPC, the courts can take cognizance only when it receives a report of the facts from the police or upon a complaint being made by the victim or her family.

Protection of Women from Domestic Violence Act, 2005 

The Protection of Women from Domestic Violence Act, 2005 ("Domestic Violence Act") was passed in order to provide a civil law remedy for the protection of women from domestic violence in India. The Domestic Violence Act encompasses all forms of physical, verbal, emotional, economic and sexual abuse and forms a subset of the anti-dowry laws to the extent it is one of the reasons for domestic violence. Section 3 of the Domestic Violence Act specifically incorporates all forms of harassment, injury and harms inflicted to coerce a woman to meet an unlawful demand for dowry. Some of the common remedies under the Domestic Violence Act include:
 protection orders – prohibiting a person from committing domestic violence;
 residence orders – dispossessing such person from a shared household;
 custody orders – granting custody of a child; and
 compensation orders – directing payment of compensation.

International conventions 
India is a party to several international human rights instruments which provide theoretical remedies to the dowry problems. These international conventions include the Universal Declaration of Human Rights ("UDHR"), International Covenant on Civil and Political Rights ("ICCPR"), the International Covenant on Economic, Social, and Cultural Rights ("ICESCR"), the Convention on the Elimination of All Forms of Discrimination Against Women ("CEDAW"), and the Convention on the Rights of the Child ("CRC"). CEDAW codifies the rights most relevant to the discussion of dowry-related violence: the rights of women. However, there are issues of non-intervention and cultural relativism which impede the use of international law to combat dowry deaths.

Criticisms of the Dowry Laws

Misuse  
There is growing criticism that the dowry laws are often being misused, particularly the section 498A of the Indian Penal Code which is observed by many in India as being prone to misuse because of mechanical arrests by the police. According to the National Crime Records Bureau statistics, in 2012, nearly 200,000 people including 47,951 women, were arrested in regard to dowry offences. However, only 15% of the accused were convicted.

In many cases of 498a, huge amounts of dowry are claimed without any valid reasoning. A rickshaw puller's wife can allege that she gave crores of money as dowry and since it is a cognizable case, police are bound to register the case. And in most cases, the capacity of the wife or her parents and the source of the funds are never tracked.

In 2005, Section 498A IPC was upheld by the Supreme Court of India when it was challenged. In 2010, the Supreme Court spoke about the misuse of anti-dowry laws in Preeti Gupta & Another v. State of Jharkhand & Another and more detailed investigation was recommended. Following the observations of the Supreme Court Indian parliament set up a committee headed by Bhagat Singh Koshyari. In July 2014, in the case of Arnesh Kumar v. State of Bihar & Anr., a two-judge bench of the Supreme Court reviewed the enforcement of section 41(1)(A) of CrPC which instructs state of following certain procedure before arrest, and went on to observe that the 498A had become a powerful weapon in the hands of disgruntled wives where innocent people were arrested without any evidence due to non-bailable and cognizable nature of the law. The decision received criticism from feminists because it weakened the negotiating power of women. Others welcomed the decision as landmark judgment to uphold the human rights of innocent people. An organization called the Save Indian Family Foundation was founded to combat abuses of IPC 498a.

On 19 April 2015, the Indian government sought to introduce a bill to amend Section 498A IPC based on the suggestions of the Law Commission and Justice Malimath committee on reforms of criminal justice. News reports indicate that the proposed amendment will make the offence compoundable and this would facilitate couples to settle their disputes.

Nisha Sharma Lawsuit 

The Nisha Sharma dowry case was an anti-dowry lawsuit in India. It began in 2003 when Nisha Sharma accused her prospective groom, Munish Dalal, of demanding dowry. The case got much coverage from Indian and international media. Nisha Sharma was portrayed as a youth icon and a role model for other women. However, it was later found that the Nisha had fabricated the charges to wiggle out of the wedding, and in 2012 all accused were acquitted.

Ineffectiveness 
Although Indian laws against dowries have been in effect for decades, they have been largely criticised as being ineffective. Despite the Indian government's efforts, the practice of dowry deaths and murders continues to take place unchecked in many parts of India and this has further added to the concerns of enforcement. There is criticism by women's groups that India's dowry harassment laws are ineffective because the statutes are too vague, the police and the courts do not enforce the laws and social mores keep women subservient and docile, giving them a subordinate status in the society.

Further, many women are afraid to implicate their husbands in a dowry crime simply because the Indian society is viewed as having conditioned women to anticipate or expect abuse and in some sense eventually, endure it. While the laws give great powers, they are not effectively enforced by the police or by courts. It can take up to 10 years for a case to go to court and even once in court, husbands and in-laws end up getting away with extortion or even murder because the women and their families cannot prove 'beyond reasonable doubt' that they are the victims of such crimes, as there are rarely any outside witnesses.

See also 

 Bride burning
 Domestic violence in India
 Dowry death

General related:

 Women in India
 Weddings in India
 Bride price
 Female foeticide in India
 Social issues in India

India related:

 Domestic violence in India
 Female foeticide in India
 Gender inequality in India
 Gender pay gap in India
 Kerala snakebite murder
 Men's rights movement in India
 National Commission for Women
 Rape in India
 Welfare schemes for women in India
 Women in agriculture in India
 Women in India
 Women in Indian Armed Forces
 Women's Reservation Bill
 Women's suffrage in India

References 

 "Dowry & Inheritance" edited by Smt. Basu, Women Unlimited & Kali for Women, New Delhi 2005.

Marriage in India
Social issues in India